Café du Monde (French for "Café of the World" or "the People's Café") is a renowned open-air coffee shop located on Decatur Street in the French Quarter of New Orleans, Louisiana, United States. It is a New Orleans landmark and tourist destination, known for its café au lait and beignets. Its coffee with chicory is widely available in the continental United States.

History
The French brought coffee with them as they began to settle along the Gulf Coast and the Mississippi River, circa 1700. During the American Civil War, the New Orleans Creoles developed the chicory-blended coffee (as there was a coffee shortage) — which has continued to be served at Café Du Monde and other New Orleans restaurants. Chicory adds a chocolate-like flavor to café au lait.

The Acadians (Cajuns) from Nova Scotia brought other French customs, such as the beignet, to Louisiana in the 18th century. Unlike most doughnuts, beignets are squared pieces of dough with no hole in the middle and are most often covered with powdered sugar. Sometimes they are seen served with fruit, jam, maple syrup, or even savory items.  At Café du Monde, the beignets are served with a thick coating of powdered sugar and sold in orders of three.

The menu at Café Du Monde includes only dark-roasted coffee with chicory (served black or au lait), beignets, white and chocolate milk, hot chocolate, and fresh-squeezed orange juice. According to the Café du Monde's vice-president, Burton E. Benrud Jr., the beignets remain the only food item on the French Market location's menu; and Café Du Monde is committed to "keeping things the way they've always been: recipes have gone relatively unchanged."

Post-Katrina
Due to Hurricane Katrina, the shop closed at midnight on August 27, 2005. Although it suffered only minor damage, it remained closed for nearly two months. Owners took advantage of the low-traffic interval afterwards to refurbish the eating areas and kitchens. Six weeks after the hurricane, Café Du Monde began promoting its re-opening as a sign that the city's recovery had begun. Over 100 news media outlets, including ABC-TV's Good Morning America, reported on the re-opening.  The French Quarter location reopened on October 19, 2005, to national media attention.

Locations
"The Butcher's Hall" is the name of the original building at the French Market site where the Café Du Monde is located. It was built by the Spanish in 1791; however, it was damaged by a hurricane in 1812. A new market building went up in 1813. The coffee stand was established at the upriver end of the French Market in 1862.

For over a century Café Du Monde was one of two similar coffee-and-beignet places in the Market, the other being Morning Call, which was established in 1870 and moved out of the old French Market in 1974 to the suburban area of Metairie. After losing its lease in Metairie, Morning Call eventually moved into a large facility in New Orlean's City Park where several years later Cafe du Monde displaced them and gained another lucrative venue, despite having to pay a considerable fee to the City of New Orleans for the location.

Starting in the late 1980s, Café Du Monde opened additional locations in shopping malls. There are a total of nine Café du Monde coffee stand locations in the New Orleans metropolitan area: the original located in the French Market at 800 Decatur Street, Riverwalk Marketplace, Esplanade Mall, Lakeside Mall, Oakwood Mall, Veterans Boulevard, Mandeville, Covington., City Park in New Orleans, and New Orleans Louis Armstrong International Airport.

Japanese franchise

Beginning with the 1984 Louisiana World Exposition in New Orleans, Café Du Monde was approached by Japanese businesses interested in expanding the brand to Japan.  In 1989 the Duskin Company formally contacted Café Du Monde, and a franchise agreement was agreed in time for Duskin to open its first Japanese outlets in 1990. The franchise expanded to a peak of 32 locations, and as of 2016 has 10 locations in Japan. However, in the days immediately preceding the end of the franchise agreement, there was only one location remaining.

For the most part, the Japanese Café Du Monde franchise has kept the same aesthetic as the original locations: green and white color scheme and the style of French Quarter architecture. Unlike the Café Du Monde stores in Louisiana, the Japan franchise expanded the original menu by adding different varieties of beignets, but the Café Du Monde coffee with chicory stays the same. Along with their varieties of beignet toppings, the Japanese franchise also offers seasonal desserts, which are not offered at Café Du Monde in Louisiana. However, Duskin ended the business relationship in early 2018, closing all Café Du Monde locations in Japan on March 31, 2018.

Grocery stores
Since the early 1990s, Café du Monde coffee can generally be purchased in independent East Asian grocery stores and markets across the Continental United States. Following the Vietnam War, many refugees from the country arrived in the United States, and were accustomed to French-style chicory coffee, a legacy they had in common with Louisiana from the French Colonial era. As more families began to settle in cities around the Gulf Coast, in time many Vietnamese in the New Orleans area began to frequent Café du Monde, as well as work there. Many in this community would send the characteristic orange-yellow tins of Café Du Monde coffee to family and friends around the country, as an alternative to American coffee which lacked chicory and gradually this began to be stocked by markets catering to this demographic.

In popular culture
Café Du Monde has appeared in multiple fictional depictions of the city including the "Dave Robicheaux" series of novels by James Lee Burke, and novels by John Connolly, Adam Gnade, Poppy Z. Brite, Sherrilyn Kenyon, Anne Rice, Kresley Cole, David Morrell, and Nancy A. Collins. The café as it appeared in 1955 can be seen in an extended sequence in the William Castle film New Orleans Uncensored; and as it appeared pre-Katrina in two scenes of the 2003 movie Runaway Jury.

The business is sung about in the Jimmy Buffett song, "The Wino and I Know." In a 2009 episode of Man v. Food centered in New Orleans, the restaurant is visited by Adam Richman. In the 2013 movie Now You See Me, the character Merritt McKinney played by Woody Harrelson performs his magic tricks inside the café. In addition, it is featured multiple times in the TV series Tremé. Café Du Monde is prominently featured as a destination spot in the 2014 film Chef, directed by and starring Jon Favreau.
The business also appeared in one of “The Simpsons” episodes.

See also
 French Market
 List of doughnut shops
 List of Louisiana Creole restaurants

References

External links

 Café du Monde

1862 establishments in Louisiana
Bakeries of the United States
Bakery cafés
Coffee brands
Coffeehouses and cafés in the United States
Doughnut shops in the United States
French Quarter
Landmarks in Louisiana
Louisiana Creole restaurants in the United States
Restaurants established in 1862
Restaurants in New Orleans